Anna Arina Viktorovna Marenko (born 2 January 1992) is a Russian former professional tennis player.

Her highest WTA singles ranking is 411, which she reached on 4 July 2011. Her best WTA doubles ranking is 338, which she achieved on 20 December 2010. She's half-sister to the professional tennis player Andrey Rublev.

ITF Circuit finals

Singles: 1 (runner-up)

Doubles: 7 (5 titles, 2 runner-ups)

References

External links
 
 
 
 
 Anna-Arina Merenko, coach profile at the Spartak Moscow tennis school website 

1992 births
Living people
Tennis players from Moscow
Russian female tennis players